Should the World Fail to Fall Apart is the debut album by the British solo artist Peter Murphy, formerly of the gothic rock band Bauhaus. The album contains Murphy's covers of Magazine's "The Light Pours Out of Me" and Pere Ubu's "Final Solution."  It was released in 1986.

Production
Many guest musicians appear on the album, including Howard Hughes and John McGeoch.

Critical reception
Trouser Press wrote: "If Murphy could remove the melodrama from his delivery, a lot of the songs might have been quite nice. But even at low volume and languorous tempo, he can’t shake the old goth theatrics out of his voice." The Spin Alternative Record Guide called the album "the least perfunctory" of Murphy's solo releases.

Track listing

Original LP track listing
All tracks composed by Peter Murphy and Howard Hughes (Stephen Betts); except where indicated
 "Canvas Beauty (Romance Version)"
 "The Light Pours Out of Me" (Howard Devoto, Pete Shelley, John McGeoch)
 "Confessions"
 "Should the World Fail to Fall Apart"
 "Never Man" (Peter Murphy)
 "God Sends"
 "Blue Heart" 
 "The Answer Is Clear"
 "Final Solution" (David Thomas, Craig Bell)
 "Jemal" (Peter Murphy)

Canadian LP track listing
The Canadian version of the LP, released on Vertigo/PolyGram, has a different cover as well an alternative track listing:

 "Should the World Fail to Fall Apart" 
 "Never Man"
 "Tale of the Tongue"
 "God Sends"
 "Blue Heart"
 "The Answer Is Clear"
 "Confessions
 "Final Solution"
 "Jemal"
 "The Light Pours Out of Me"

In addition to reordering, the track "Canvas Beauty" was dropped in favor of "Tale of The Tongue", which had been released in the UK as a non-album single.

2011 deluxe edition bonus CD 
In July 2011, Cherry Red Records released a 25th anniversary deluxe edition of the album with a bonus disc of 13 B-sides and remixes:

 "Canvas Beauty" (Fast Version)
 "The Light Pours Out of Me" (Original version)
 "Confessions" (Remix)
 "Should the World Fail to Fall Apart" (Version 3)
 "Stay"
 "Tale of the Tongue" (12″ Version)
 "Blue Heart" (12″ Version)
 "The Answer Is Clear" (Version)
 "Final Solution" (Club mix)
 "Jemal" (Version 2)
 "Should the World Fail to Fall Apart" (Unreleased version)
 "Final Solution" (Full version)
 "Final Solution" (Third and final mix)

 Track 1 released on Beggars Banquet 12″ EP SOVE 2359 (CA), 1986
 Track 2 released on a Various Artists sampler, 1985
 Tracks 3, 4 and 10 released on Beggars Banquet 12″ BEG 179T (U.K.), 1987
 Track 5 exact origin unknown
 Track 6 released on Beggars Banquet 12″ BEG 174T (U.K.), 1986
 Track 7 released on Beggars Banquet 12″ BEG 162T (U.K.), 1986
 Track 8 released on Beggars Banquet 7″ BEG 143 (U.K.), 1985
 Tracks 9 and 12 released on Beggars Banquet 12″ BEG 143T (U.K.), 1985
 Track 11 is a previously unreleased alternate mix
 Track 13 released on Beggars Banquet 12″ BEG 143TP (U.K.), 1985

Personnel
Peter Murphy - "naive" guitar, keyboards, drum programming, lead vocals, harmony vocals
Howard Hughes - guitar, keyboards, backing vocals, drum programming, piano
Chris Pye, John McGeoch, Peter Bonas, Philip Rambow, Steve Turner - guitar
Daniel Ash - "manic" guitar
Erkan Oğur - acoustic guitar, EBow
Eddie Branch, Paul Cover - bass
Steven Young - drum programming
Martin McCarrick - cello
Gini Bell - violin
Joji Hirota - congas
Jon Keleihor - "potty" percussion
Paul Vincent Lawford - "complementary rhythms" percussion
Jon Self - harmonica
Technical
Gerry Kitchingham, John Fryer - engineer
Carlos 'Sosa' - cover painting

References

Peter Murphy (musician) albums
1986 debut albums
Beggars Banquet Records albums